Sociedad Deportiva Becerreá is a Spanish football club based in Becerreá, Lugo, in the autonomous community of Galicia. It currently plays in Segunda Autonómica - Group 8, the seventh level of Spanish football, holding home games at Campo Municipal.

Season to season

External links
Official website 
Segunda Autonómica - Group 8 

Football clubs in Galicia (Spain)
Divisiones Regionales de Fútbol clubs
Association football clubs established in 1985
1985 establishments in Spain